Legoland Korea is a theme park in Chuncheon, Gangwon Province, South Korea. It opened on May 5, 2022, and is the first and only Legoland on an island. Legoland Korea Resort covers 280,000 square meters (3.01 million square feet), making it the world's second largest Legoland theme park after Legoland New York and the 2nd largest in Asia behind Legoland Malaysia Resort which covers 76 acres of land.

History 
Gangwon Province and Merlin Entertainment Group signed an MOA on the Legoland Korea Resort Development Project on September 1, 2011. A representative of Gangwon Province noted, "Legoland Korea, if opening, will attract two million tourists annually, create 9,800 jobs and boost local tax revenue by 4.4 billion won." The theme park officially opened on May 5, 2022.

Criticism and issues
Legoland Korea has been marred by debt and financial issues. It has also been criticized for its high admission and parking fees for a relatively small park. Since its opening, the actual number of visitors has been significantly lower than the projected two million. Furthermore, there has been additional criticism in regards to the park location on Jungdo Island, which was built over an ancient archaeological site, causing permanent damage. The island was home to a massive site of rare relics going back 5,000 years.

Notes

References

External links 
 

Legoland
Amusement parks in South Korea
Aquaria in South Korea
Amusement parks opened in 2022
2022 establishments in South Korea
Chuncheon